Crostwight is a small village and former civil parish, now in the parish of Honing, in the North Norfolk district, in the north-east of the county of Norfolk, England. In the past, it was sometimes called Crostwick, but this should be avoided, for fear of confusion with the different village of Crostwick, also in Norfolk. In 1931 the parish had a population of 61.

Apart from the church, the village consists of Crostwight Hall, its cottages and outbuildings, an old rectory, and a few other houses.

Name
The name of Crostwight is considered to be Old Norse in origin (kross, 'cross' + þveit, 'clearing'). There are seven such names in Norfolk ending in -thwaite, and one in Suffolk, showing early Scandinavian settlement. While the suffix -thwaite was familiar north of the Humber and has survived there, it has been corrupted elsewhere. Forms of Crostwight's name recorded include Crostwit in 1086, Crosthueit in 1198, and Crostweyt in 1810.

History
Crostwight is recorded in the Domesday Book of 1086, which spells its name 'Crostwit'. At that time, it was held by Geoffrey Baynard under Ralph Baynard. The whole was described as one league (leuca) in length and seven furlongs broad. There is a reference to the church of St Benet's of Hulme, and the people mentioned include Esger the staller and Geoffrey Baynard.

At the time of the Peasants' Revolt of 1381, the area of North Walsham was "the cradle, the supreme fortress, and the tomb of the Norfolk rebels", generating surveys of households, and Crostwight is one of the few places for which complete records survive. Its heads of households were found to consist of nine cultivators, three weavers, two spinsters, one dyer and one fuller.

According to William White's Gazetteer of 1845: 

More was said in the 1883 edition of White's Gazetteer: 

At the time of the 1841 census, the surnames recorded for Crostwight are Atkins, Bacon, Burton, Cinlon, Colman, Crowe, Flowerday, Frary, Furnace, Hubbard, Lane, Jarvis, Mays, Salmon, Reed, Shephard, Webster and Wright.

At the census of 1921, the parish's population was seventy-one, and by 1931 it had fallen to sixty-one. On 1 April 1935, Crostwight was abolished as a civil parish and incorporated into its larger neighbour, Honing.

The parish records, dating from 1698 to 1988, are held by the Norfolk Record Office at its Archive Centre in Martineau Lane, Norwich.

Church of All Saints

The parish church stands on its own not far from the Old Rectory, but is distant from the rest of the village.

In 1810, Charles Parkin wrote of the church: 

John Marius Wilson's Imperial Gazetteer of England and Wales (1870–1872) says of it: "The living is a rectory in the diocese of Norwich. Value, £66. Patron, M. Shephard, Esq. The church is old but good, and has a tower."

The church has a series of late medieval wall-paintings (see below). Its massive tower of flint and local stone was reduced in height in 1910, after ivy had made part of it unsafe, and the bells were hung lower. Inside the church is a rood screen carved with dragons, wild men, and flying hearts, but the carving may be modern or restored. The chancel arch, like some walls, is decorated with paintings, but not the screen. There is an octagonal Purbeck stone font, which stands on pillars and on a substantial two-tier octagonal base. The church has no electricity and is lit by oil lamps. The church is a Grade I listed building .

Crostwight lost only one man during the Second World War, and he is commemorated by his own memorial inside the church, which reads: "In honoured memory of HUBERT ARTHUR FRANCIS, who gave his life aboard H.M.S. Royal Oak at Scapa Flow 14th October 1939 Faithful unto death".

Despite the smallness of its ecclesiastical parish, the church is still used. Crostwight is now part of the Church of England united benefice of 'Smallburgh with Dilham with Honing and Crostwight', which has a rector.

The Crostwight Passion Cycle
The medieval wall paintings on the church's north wall date from the late 14th or early 15th century and have been called the Crostwight Passion Cycle. An article at paintedchurch.org considers that this is "...despite its fragmentary condition, one of the most interesting Passion Cycles in England".

All of the scenes are in fragments and few are clear. The order of the scenes is illogical, beginning on the bottom left with Christ's Entry into Jerusalem. To the right of that is the Last Supper, and further right comes the Washing of Feet. Above is the Arrest in Gethsemane, and to the right of that a scene which may be Christ before Herod or Pilate, then the Crowning with Thorns, above which is the Crucifixion. This includes one of the crucified thieves, and behind him is the Roman Stephaton with a bucket of vinegar and a spear. On a lower tier, underneath the Last Supper, is the Ascension. In the splay of a window is the Agony in the Garden, with Christ kneeling in the foreground, St Peter, St James and St John the Apostle behind him. Above this are the remains of another scene which may be the Resurrection.

Other paintings
Other paintings in the parish church include one of the Seven Deadly Sins. This is estimated to date from the late fourteenth century and was discovered in the 1840s by a Mr Gunn. It centres on a tree growing out of the jaws of hell, which appears as the mouth of a giant fish, full of sinners who are being pushed down into hell by a devil. Above, the seven deadly sins grow on the tree like fruit. One of these is clearly marked in Latin with the name of one of the deadly sins, Socordia, or Sloth.

Another painting shows two women approaching the gates of Heaven, with an angel to greet them and a devil watching from below. Sir Nikolaus Pevsner suggests that this is a warning against gossip, and it has also been compared to a church painting at Swanbourne which is an allegory of penitent and unpenitent souls.

In June 1848, The Gentleman's Magazine noted that Dawson Turner had exhibited to the Society of Antiquaries "two sets of drawings, illustrative of the fresco paintings, and other ancient remains, in the parish churches of Gateley and Crostwight, in the county of Norfolk." Turner later reported on the Seven Deadly Sins and other paintings at Crostwight in the Norfolk and Norwich Archaeological Society's Norfolk Archaeology for 1849, with drawings by Mrs Gunn.

Crostwight Hall

Crostwight Hall is a notable country house and is described by Michael Sayer in Burke's & Savills Guide to Country Houses (Volume III, East Anglia). Its garden is one of thirty-three Historic Parks and Gardens listed in the Local Plan for North Norfolk. The historic main house, Old Crostwight Hall, was considered as a project by the Norfolk Historic Buildings Trust but was instead rebuilt by a developer.

The house has sometimes been called 'Crostwick Hall', for instance in Parkin's Essay Towards a Topographical History of the County of Norfolk (1810), where it is called "an agreeable old seat".

The Strangers' Hall Museum at Norwich has an unusual survival from the mid-19th century: an anonymous St Valentine's Day card dated and postmarked 1862, said by the museum to be addressed to "Miss Jenny Lowe [query Love], Crostwight Hall, Smallburgh, Norfolk". The coloured card is embossed with couples, cherubs and roses, and in the middle is a silver bird on a silk panel. On the pictorial side of the card are the printed words "My dearest Miss, I send thee a kiss", and on the other is written by hand "Good Morrow Valentine". As the Hall was then occupied by the Lane family, the addressee may be Miss Jenny Lane.

Geography
Crostwight Heath (dense acidic scrubland) and Crostwight Common (broad-leaved coppiced semi-natural woodland) are both designated in the North Norfolk Local Plan as County Wildlife Sites.

List of rectors of Crostwight
To 1756:
 
1300: Ralph de Somerton, presented by Sir Peter Roscelyn
1305: ( - ) de Billokby
1313: Robert de Warham
1313: Richard de Halesworth, presented by Sir Peter Roscelyn
1335: John Taillor, by Sim. Kemyng
1348: William de Ely, by John Kenyng
1373: Nich. Lomb, by Joan, widow of John Costeyn
1389: Roger de Holand
1391: William Nethergate, by John Costeyn
1404: John Blake, by Margery, widow of Henry de Betele
1413: Henry Lesyngham, by John Elmham
1414: Richard Newman, by Thomas Derham
1447: Robert Casmond, by Nicholas Waterman
1449: John Bullock, by Nicholas Waterman, gent.
1452: John Leigh
1461: Robert Wilkys, by Henry Heydon and Thomas Brampton
1483: Thomas Curteys, by John Bishop
1484: John Rudham
1493: Roger Humfrey
1493: Thomas Lyng, by Sir John Paston
1497: Thomas Miles, by John Bishop
1503: John Trew, by Robert Harridaunce, Esq.
1510: Stephen Drury
1556: Robert Lindley, by Margaret Bishop, widow
1557: Robert Best
1579: William Olyver, by Thomas Groos, Esq.
1598: Edmund Alphen
1602: Thomas Cannam, by Thomas Groos, Esq.
1630: Thomas Ramsey, by Sir Charles le Groos
1665: Thomas Falke, by Thomas le Groos, Esq.
16--: Charles Spicer
1669: And. Call.
1672: Valentine Husband, by Robert Tutpill, gent.
1674: Henry Gooch
1687: Bambridge Dean, by Charles le Groos alias Harman, Esq.
1694: John Rolfe
17--: Noah Violas
1720: Mundeford Spelman (on the death of Violas), presented by Charles Harman alias le Gross, Esq.
1736: John Wakeman, by Robert, Lord Walpole
1753: Thomas Batman, by Margaret, Countess of Orford
1754: James Adamson, by John Sharp, Esq. (hac vice)
1756: Thomas Hutchingson, by the Bishop (a lapse)
 

After 1756:
fl. 1845: Henry Atkinson
fl. 1883: John Bartholomew Vale (1823–96)
fl. 1899: H. G. Corner

References

External links

Satellite photograph at maps.google.co.uk
Location map at British-towns.net
A Vision of Crostwight CP/AP at edina.ac.uk

Villages in Norfolk
Former civil parishes in Norfolk
North Norfolk